Izal may refer to:

 Izal or Iaal, a village in Lebanon
 Izal or Itzalle, a municipality in the Salazar Valley, Spain
 Izal, a disinfectant and range of products made by Newton, Chambers & Co.
 , a Spanish indie band founded and led by Mikel Izal